L.A. Shah Law College is a heritage Law college of Ahmedabad, in the State of Gujarat. This college has gained the approval of Bar Council of India (BCI), New Delhi. It offers three years undergraduate course (LL.B. or Bachelor of Law) and LL.M. degree in legal education affiliated to the Gujarat University.

History
Gujarat Law Society established the college on 20 June 1927. It is the fourth oldest Law College to be affiliated to the University of Bombay. Initially the University of Bombay recognised the college in 1935. Thereafter Gujarat University gave the affiliation in 1950.

Alumni
 Jayantilal Chhotalal Shah, Former Chief Justice of India
 Aziz Mushabber Ahmadi, Former Chief Justice of India
 C. K. Thakker, Judge of the Supreme Court of India
 Nomanbhai Mahmedbhai Miabhoy, Chief Justice of Gujarat High Court
 Suresh Mehta, Former Chief Minister of Gujarat
 Anil R. Dave, Judge of the Supreme Court of India
 Manharlal Pranlal Thakkar, Judge of the Supreme Court of India
 Manharlal Bhikhalal Shah, Judge of the Supreme Court of India
 Rashmin Manharbhai Chhaya, Judge of Gujarat High Court
 Badruddin Shaikh
 Ela Bhatt
 Chinu Modi
 Vijay Patel
 Harsha N. Devani
 Rekha Doshit

References

Educational institutions established in 1927
1927 establishments in India
Law schools in Gujarat
Colleges affiliated to Gujarat University
Universities and colleges in Ahmedabad